Abernathy Municipal Airport  is a public use airport in Hale County, Texas, United States. It is owned by the City of Abernathy and located four nautical miles (5 mi, 7 km) east of its central business district.

History 
The Abernathy Municipal Airport was built during World War II and opened in November 1943 as Abernathy Auxiliary Field  by the United States Army Air Forces as an auxiliary field for nearby Lubbock Army Air Field and South Plains Army Air Field. The field was initially built for use by Lubbock Army Air Field, but following the activation of South Plains Army Air Field, was assigned to that base. In 1944 after the conclusion of training operations at South Plains Army Air Field, Abernathy reverted to Lubbock Army Air Field for the duration of the war. At the end of World War II, The United States military maintained over 5,600 bases stateside and around the world. The field was declared surplus and released to the War Assets Administration for disposal. The field was given to the City of Abernathy for use as a civil airport.

Facilities and aircraft 
Abernathy Municipal Airport covers an area of 640 acres (259 ha) at an elevation of 3,327 feet (1,014 m) above mean sea level. It has one runway designated 17/35 with an asphalt surface measuring 4,000 by 75 feet (1,219 x 23 m). For the 12-month period ending June 25, 2009, the airport had 600 general aviation aircraft operations, an average of 50 per month.

See also 

 Texas World War II Army Airfields
 List of airports in Texas

References

Other sources 

 
 Manning, Thomas A. (2005), History of Air Education and Training Command, 1942–2002.  Office of History and Research, Headquarters, AETC, Randolph AFB, Texas 
 Shaw, Frederick J. (2004), Locating Air Force Base Sites, History’s Legacy, Air Force History and Museums Program, United States Air Force, Washington DC. 
 Thole, Lou (1999), Forgotten Fields of America : World War II Bases and Training, Then and Now - Vol. 2.  Publisher: Pictorial Histories Pub,

External links 
 Abernathy Municipal (F83) at Texas DOT airport directory
 Aerial image as of December 1995 from USGS The National Map
 

Airports in Texas
Buildings and structures in Hale County, Texas
Transportation in Hale County, Texas
Airfields of the United States Army Air Forces in Texas